Father There Is Only One is a 2019 Spanish comedy film directed and starring Santiago Segura, and scored by Roque Baños. It is a remake of the Argentine film Ten Days Without Mom. The film sparked two sequels, Father There Is Only One 2 (2020) and Padre no hay más que uno 3 (2022).

Cast

Production 
The film was produced by Bowfinger International Pictures, Sony Pictures International Productions and Mamá se fue de viaje la película A.I.E., alongside Cindy Teperman and Mogambo, with the collaboration of Atresmedia Cine, and the participation of Amazon Prime Video and Atresmedia.

Release 
It was the second best premiere at the Spanish box office in 2019. It raised more than 3 millions of euros and 600.000 spectators.

See also 
 List of Spanish films of 2019

References

External links
 

Spanish comedy films
2019 comedy films
2019 films
Films directed by Santiago Segura
Films scored by Roque Baños
Atresmedia Cine films
Sony Pictures films
Bowfinger International Pictures films
2010s Spanish-language films
Spanish remakes of Argentine films
2010s Spanish films